Seoul Metropolitan City Route 71 is an urban road located in Seoul, South Korea.

Stopovers
 Seoul
 Songpa District - Gwangjin District - Jungnang District

List of Facilities 
IS: Intersection, IC: Interchange

References

Roads in Seoul